Vira Ostapivna Selianska (pen name Vira Vovk (2 January 1926 – 16 July 2022) was a Ukrainian writer, critic and translator. She wrote in Ukrainian, German and Portuguese.

Biography
Born in Boryslav in 1926, she grew up in the Hutsul region in the town of Kuty (at that time on the Polish-Romanian border). Vira Vovk's secondary education was completed in Lviv and Dresden. She studied Germanics, music history and comparative literature at the University of Tübingen. In 1945, she emigrated with her mother to Portugal and in 1949, further to Brazil. She went to Rio de Janeiro where she completed her university studies. Post graduate studies were completed at Columbia University (New York City) and Munich University. 

Vovk received a PhD and became professor of German literature at the State University of Rio de Janeiro. Vovk has created ten collections of poetry, ten novels, and eleven plays and has made numerous translations of Western writers into Ukrainian and Ukrainian writers into Portuguese.

Vovk died on 16 July 2022 in Rio de Janeiro, Brazil at the age 96.

Awards and achievements
She received the Ivan Franko Literary award in 1957, 1979, 1982 and 1990, the Blahovist award 2000. She actively propagated Ukrainian culture and language. In 2008, Vovk received Ukrainian state award Shevchenko National Prize.

Sources 
 Danylo Husar Struk, Vira Vovk at Internet Encyclopedia of Ukraine 
 Viktoriia Kostiuchenko, Віра Вовк: Читачі в Бразилії і Португалії мають одне джерело, то є мої видання (Vera Wolf: Readers in Brazil and Portugal have one source, that is my publications), Ukraina Moloda Newspaper, April 2008, in Ukrainian.
 Літературні вечори в Українському Інституті Модерного Мистецтва Чикаго, 1973—2006 // Укладачі: Віра Боднарук, Володимир Білецький. — Донецьк: Український культурологічний центр, 2006. — 140 с.
 Virtual library of Ukrainian poetry by the New York group.
 Liudmyla Taran, Українка з Бразилії (A Ukrainian from Brazil), Den, 13.06.2001
 Vira Vovk, Карнавал. Оповідання до картин Юрія Соловія (Carnival. Narratives to paintings of Yurii Solovii). Rio de Janeiro, 1986.

References

1926 births
2022 deaths
Brazilian non-fiction writers
Ukrainian emigrants to Brazil
Ukrainian women writers
Ukrainian women poets
People from Boryslav
People from Lwów Voivodeship
Ukrainian–Portuguese translators
20th-century translators
20th-century Brazilian women writers
Ukrainian-language writers
20th-century pseudonymous writers
Pseudonymous women writers
University of Tübingen alumni
Federal University of Rio de Janeiro alumni
Recipients of the Order of Princess Olga, 3rd class